KTHU is a commercial radio station located in Corning, California, broadcasting to the Northern California and area on 100.7 FM.  KTHU airs a classic rock music format branded as "Thunder 100.7".

External links
Official Website

THU
Classic rock radio stations in the United States
Radio stations established in 1988